Annalena Charlotte Alma Baerbock (born 15 December 1980) is a German politician of the Alliance 90/The Greens party serving as Germany's minister for foreign affairs since 2021.

From 2018 to January 2022, Baerbock served as co-leader of Alliance 90/The Greens, alongside Robert Habeck. She was the party's candidate for chancellor in the 2021 federal election. However, after the backlash she received due to a series of scandals involving her acts of plagiarism and exaggeration of her professional background in her CV, Olaf Scholz from SPD secured the chancellery instead. After the election, the Greens formed a traffic light coalition led by Olaf Scholz, and Baerbock was sworn in as Germany's first female foreign minister on 8 December 2021.

Born in Hanover, West Germany, in 1980, Baerbock attended the University of Hamburg and the London School of Economics and Political Science. She was first elected to the Bundestag in 2013. From 2012 to 2015, she was a member of the party council of Alliance 90/The Greens and from 2009 to 2013, the leader of her party's group in the state of Brandenburg.

Early life and education 
Baerbock is the daughter of a social worker and a mechanical engineer who worked for WABCO Vehicle Control Systems. After initially living in Nuremberg for several years, she moved to live in an old reconstructed farmhouse that her family owned in Schulenburg, which is part of Pattensen, near Hanover in Lower Saxony. There, she grew up with her two sisters and two cousins. As a child, she joined her parents at anti-war and anti-nuclear power protests organized or supported by the Green Party. She attended the Humboldt School in Hanover and at the age of 16, spent an exchange year at Lake Highland Preparatory School in Orlando, Florida.

As a teenager, Baerbock was a competitive trampoline gymnast, taking part in German championships and winning bronze three times.

From 2000 to 2004, Baerbock studied political science and public law at the University of Hamburg. She also worked as a journalist for the Hannoversche Allgemeine Zeitung from 2000 to 2003. She completed internships at Norddeutscher Rundfunk, Deutsche Presseagentur and the Council of Europe.

In 2005, Baerbock completed a one-year master course in public international law at the London School of Economics (LSE). During her time at LSE, she stayed at Carr-Saunders Hall in Fitzrovia. In 2005, she was a trainee at the British Institute of International and Comparative Law (BIICL). She also started a dissertation on natural disasters and humanitarian aid at the Free University of Berlin, but did not finish it.

Early career 
After her studies, Baerbock worked from 2005 to 2008 in the office of MEP Elisabeth Schroedter. In 2008 and 2009, she worked as an adviser on foreign and security policies for the parliamentary group of the Alliance 90/The Greens in the Bundestag.

Political career

Beginnings 

Baerbock became a member of Alliance 90/The Greens in 2005. In October 2008, she was elected to the executive board of her party's state group in Brandenburg. The next year she succeeded Ska Keller as co-chair of the board (with Benjamin Raschke), an office she held until 2013.

Baerbock served as the national spokesperson for the Green Party's working group on European affairs from 2008 to 2013. From 2009 to 2012, she was a member of the executive board of the European Green Party, under the leadership of co-chairs Philippe Lamberts and Monica Frassoni.

Member of the German Bundestag: 2013–present 
In 2009, Baerbock unsuccessfully ran for a place on her party's electoral list for the federal elections. In 2013, she was the Green Party candidate in the constituency of Potsdam – Potsdam-Mittelmark II – Teltow-Fläming II and also secured the leading spot on the party's electoral list for the State of Brandenburg. Through the electoral list, she became a member of the Bundestag.

During her first term, Baerbock was a member of the Committee on Economic Affairs and Energy and the Committee on European Affairs. In her parliamentary group, she served as speaker for climate policy. In the latter capacity, she participated in the United Nations Climate Change Conferences in Warsaw (2013), Lima (2014), Paris (2015) and Marrakesh (2016).

In addition to her committee assignments, Baerbock served as deputy chair of the Berlin-Taipei Parliamentary Circle of Friends and a member of the German-Polish Parliamentary Friendship Group from 2014 until 2017.

In the 2017 election, Baerbock was again the leading candidate in the state of Brandenburg, retaining her seat in Parliament. After the election, she was a member of the Green Party party's negotiating team in the (unsuccessful) coalition talks with the CDU/CSU and FDP. She has since been a member of the Committee on Families, Seniors, Women and Youth.

Co-leader of the Green Party: 2018–2022 

On 27 January 2018, at the Green Party's national convention in her hometown of Hanover, Baerbock was elected as one of two equal chairpersons of her party at the federal level, with Robert Habeck. She won 64% of the vote, more than her challenger, Anja Piel. At a 2019 party convention, she was re-elected with 97.1% of the votes, the highest-ever result for a party chair.

In the negotiations to form a coalition government under the leadership of Minister-President of Brandenburg Dietmar Woidke after the 2019 state elections, Baerbock was a member of her party's delegation.

Chancellor candidate: 2021 
On 19 April 2021, the federal board of the Greens officially nominated Baerbock as candidate for chancellor for the 2021 federal electionthe first time the party had nominated a single candidate instead of co-leaders. This was formally confirmed at the party congress from 11 to 13 June. Baerbock is the second woman after Angela Merkel to seek the highest government office, and the first woman nominated by her party. On election day, she was only 12 days older than Guido Westerwelle in 2002, the youngest chancellor candidate ever.
On 12 June 2021, Baerbock was confirmed as candidate for chancellor after receiving 98.5% of the confirmation votes. In the 2021 German federal election, she again ran in the constituency of Potsdam – Potsdam-Mittelmark II – Teltow-Fläming II, this time against fellow chancellor candidate Olaf Scholz. She lost the constituency to Scholz by over 15,000 votes, but was nonetheless elected to the Bundestag through the Green list in Brandenburg.

During this time, it was discovered that Baerbock committed plagiarism in a book she authored Jetzt. Wie wir unser Land erneuern, having copy-pasted 29 sentences altogether from other works. A detailed analysis of the act of plagiarism available in a German document. Another wrongdoing unearthed was that she published false information about her professional background in her CV. She incorrectly claimed that she was a member of German Marshall Fund and United Nations High Commissioner for Refugees along with many other minor institutions, which she had no formal ties to. Those events caused widespread condemnation in German public.

According to studies conducted by the German Marshall Fund and the Institute for Strategic Dialogue, both German and Russian state-backed sources have targeted Baerbock, spreading a large amount of disinformation, from false assumptions about the Greens to explicit sexism, such as the circulated online image featuring Baerbock's face photoshopped onto a naked female body with the caption "I was young and I needed the money".

Under Baerbock's leadership, the Greens won 14.8% of the national vote in 2021 and 118 seats in the Bundestag, the best result in the party's history. However, the performance was considered somewhat disappointing as the party finished third after having led in some polls earlier in the year.

Foreign minister: 2021–present 
Following the 2021 election, the Greens agreed to enter government with the FDP and the Social Democrats, as part of a traffic light coalition led by Olaf Scholz. Baerbock was named Foreign Minister and took office on 8 December 2021, the first woman ever to hold the role.

Baerbock visited Warsaw in December 2021 to meet with the Polish Foreign Minister Zbigniew Rau. They discussed Poland's dispute with the EU over the rule of law and the superiority of European Union law. Baerbock backed Poland's efforts to stop the flow of migrants seeking entry from Belarus. She rejected the idea of paying World War II reparations to Poland. Germany still asserts that Poland waived all reparation rights under the 1953 agreement and that the dispute is settled. Poland rejects this view, stating that the Polish government was then under the sway of the Soviet Union and that its 1953 refusal is non-binding.

Baerbock harbors strong Atlanticist views and is assumed to follow a foreign policy in coherent with the one pursued by the US President Joe Biden.

On 23 December 2021, Baerbock warned that Afghanistan is "heading into the worst humanitarian catastrophe of our time", with major economic sectors collapsing and more than 24 million people in need of humanitarian assistance. She said, "We cannot allow hundreds of thousands of children to die because we don't want to take action." She also promised to speed up the evacuation of more than 15,000 vulnerable Afghans, including staff who worked for Germany and their family members.

When Germany held the rotating presidency of the Group of Seven (G7) in 2022, Baerbock chaired the meetings of G7 Ministers of Foreign Affairs.

In January 2022, Baerbock refused to supply German weapons to Ukraine amid rising tensions on the Ukraine-Russia border, while NATO allies including the United States opted to send arms in support of Ukraine. In the aftermath of Russia's February 2022 invasion of Ukraine, she argued against blocking Russian access to SWIFT. Following the Bucha massacre in April 2022, she expelled 40 Russian diplomats and embassy staff from Berlin, joining other European Union countries in their response to alleged war crimes by Russian troops in Ukraine. Also in April 2022, she hosted a donor conference during which European and international governments agreed to extend 659.5 million euros ($718.6 million) in aid to Moldova, which hosted more than 100,000 refugees from Ukraine at the time.

In January 2023, Baerbock made her third visit to Ukraine by touring Kharkiv, following her travels to Bucha in May and Kyiv in September of the previous year.
In a keynote speech to the Parliamentary Assembly of the Council of Europe on 24 January, she said in English "We are fighting a war against Russia, not against each other", which was critically portrayed in the popular tabloid newspaper Bild with the headline "We are at war with Russia". Her phrasing received criticism from conservative and right-wing politicians in Germany as demonstrating un-professionalism, and criticism from Russia. A German Foreign Ministry spokesman underlined that Germany was not a party to the conflict and the speech was in a context of establishing a unified stance in opposition to a war of aggression.

Political positions

Foreign policy 

Baerbock is regarded as taking a centrist line on defense and pushing for a stronger common EU foreign policy, especially against Russia and China. She has proposed a post-pacifist foreign policy, calling for a European army under the supervision of the European Parliament and outlining steps toward Germany's denuclearization in consultation with allies. She supports NATO's eastward expansion and cooperation with the United States. In November 2020, she said: "Europe has been revolving around itself for years, the Trump administration turned its back on the world. Authoritarian states fill the gap that emerged. That leads to Russia or Turkey becoming active in our neighborhoodand the EU, as in the case of Nagorno-Karabakh, is left out.” In December 2021, Baerbock proposed a "values-driven" foreign policy in conjunction with other European democracies and NATO partners, and called on the EU to implement sanctions against Bosnian Serb leader Milorad Dodik.

Baerbock appears to have taken a pro-Israel stance in response to the 2021 Israel–Palestine crisis. She called the number of UN resolutions criticizing Israel "absurd compared to resolutions against other states."

Energy, climate and environmental policy 

Baerbock has argued in favor of a European and trans-Atlantic Green Deal. She has cited a need for technology transfer so that countries worldwide can limit the increase in global temperatures to 1.5 °C, as outlined in the Paris Agreement.

She has said that "agricultural subsidies should be oriented towards the common good" and that animal populations and meat production should be "reduced very significantly". Baerbock has also said that "climate policy is not in contradiction to the economy" and that she wishes to preserve Germany's status as an industrial location "into the 21st centuryin light of the Paris climate agreement." She supports the production of climate-neutral steel and has expressed support for climate tariffsinternational taxes on goods that are carbon-intensive. Under her policies, domestic German flights are to be made "superfluous" by 2035, by strengthening the rail network.

When the Federal Constitutional Court ruled that the greenhouse gas reductions set out in the Climate Protection Act were insufficient on 29 April 2021, Baerbock held out the prospect of setting concrete greenhouse gas savings targets in the event that her party would participate in the federal government. She also called for the quota for the annual expansion of renewable energy sources to be doubled by the mid-2020s. Baerbock has said that environmental destruction caused by climate change is becoming increasingly expensive.

Baerbock opposes the Nord Stream 2 gas pipeline project between Russia and Europe.

Baerbock is an opponent of nuclear power. In 2021, she opposed an EU proposal to label nuclear power as a green energy source.

Immigration 
Amid the European migrant crisis in 2015, Baerbock joined fellow Green parliamentarians Luise Amtsberg, Franziska Brantner, Manuel Sarrazin and Wolfgang Strengmann-Kuhn in calling for more responsibilities for the European Commission in managing the EU's intake of refugees, a clear mandate for Frontex and EU-managed facilities for asylum seekers in their countries of origin.

Other activities

Corporate boards 
 KfW, Ex-Officio Member of the Board of Supervisory Directors (since 2021)

Non-profit organizations 
  – German-Italian Centre for the European Dialogue, Ex-Officio Member of the Board of Trustees (since 2021)
 Alexander von Humboldt Foundation, Ex-Officio Member of the Board of Trustees (since 2021)
 European Council on Foreign Relations (ECFR), Member (since 2020)
 Leo Baeck Foundation, Member of the Board of Trustees
 German Federation for the Environment and Nature Conservation (BUND), Member

Since 2020, Baerbock has participated in the World Economic Forum's Young Global Leaders program, a group that has coached political representatives such as Emmanuel Macron, Sanna Marin and Jacinda Ardern.

Personal life 
Since 2007, Baerbock has been married to Daniel Holefleisch, a political consultant and PR manager who has been Senior Expert Corporate Affairs for Deutsche Post DHL Group since 2017, a lobbyist position. They have two daughters, born in 2011 and 2015. In 2013, they moved from Berlin to the Nauener Vorstadt district of Potsdam, Brandenburg.

Baerbock is a member of the Evangelical Church in Germany (EKD). She describes herself as "not religious" and remains a church member because "the idea of togetherness is extremely important" to her.

Book 
 .

References

External links 

 Baerbock's profile on the website of the Green Party parliamentary faction
, interview in German, ZDF, 10 May 2021

1980 births
Living people
21st-century German women politicians
Alumni of the London School of Economics
Female foreign ministers
Female members of the Bundestag
Foreign Ministers of Germany
Members of the Bundestag 2013–2017
Members of the Bundestag 2017–2021
Members of the Bundestag 2021–2025
Members of the Bundestag for Alliance 90/The Greens
Members of the Bundestag for Brandenburg
Politicians from Hanover
University of Hamburg alumni
Women opposition leaders
Dames Grand Cross of the Order of Isabella the Catholic
Lake Highland Preparatory School alumni